The Tibetan babax (Pterorhinus koslowi) is a species of bird in the family Leiothrichidae.
It is endemic to China. It is threatened by habitat loss.

This species was formerly placed in the genus Babax but following the publication of a comprehensive molecular phylogenetic study in 2018, Babax was subsumed in to the resurrected genus Pterorhinus.

References

Collar, N. J. & Robson C. 2007. Family Timaliidae (Babblers)  pp. 70 – 291 in; del Hoyo, J., Elliott, A. & Christie, D.A. eds. Handbook of the Birds of the World, Vol. 12. Picathartes to Tits and Chickadees. Lynx Edicions, Barcelona.

Tibetan babax
Birds of Tibet
Endemic birds of China
Tibetan babax
Taxonomy articles created by Polbot
Taxobox binomials not recognized by IUCN